The Jim Rutherford Trophy is given to the best goaltender in the Ontario Hockey League, as voted by coaches and general managers. The winner is also nominated for the CHL Goaltender of the Year award.

From 1988 until 2019, the award was named the Ontario Hockey League Goaltender of the Year Award. On May 19, 2020, the OHL unveiled the Jim Rutherford Trophy, in honour of former goaltender Jim Rutherford. Rutherford played with the Hamilton Red Wings from 1967-69 before playing in the National Hockey League with the Detroit Red Wings, Pittsburgh Penguins, Toronto Maple Leafs and Los Angeles Kings from 1970-83. Following his playing career, Rutherford joined the Windsor Compuware Spitfires as the general manager of the team from 1984-88, winning the J. Ross Robertson Cup in the 1987-88 season. In 1990, Rutherford became the general manager and president of the Detroit Compuware Ambassadors. He remained in this position as they were renamed the Detroit Junior Red Wings in 1992 until accepting a job promotion to become the general manager, president, and minority owner of the Hartford Whalers in 1994. Rutherford remained with the club as general manager when they relocated and became the Carolina Hurricanes in 1997. In 2006, Rutherford won the Stanley Cup with the Hurricanes. He stayed with the club until 2014 before stepping down and selling his shares in the Hurricanes to become the general manager of the Pittsburgh Penguins. With the Penguins, Rutherford has won the Stanley Cup two more times, in 2016 and 2017. Rutherford was named to the Hockey Hall of Fame in 2019.

Winners
Prior to 2020, the Jim Rutherford Trophy was called the Ontario Hockey Goaltender of the Year. This award was presented from 1988 until 2019.
 Blue background denotes also named CHL Goaltender of the Year
 

List of winners of Jim Rutherford Trophy.
 Blue background denotes also named CHL Goaltender of the Year

See also
 Jacques Plante Memorial Trophy – Quebec Major Junior Hockey League top goaltender
 Del Wilson Trophy – Western Hockey League top goaltender
 List of Canadian Hockey League awards

References

External links
 Ontario Hockey League

Ontario Hockey League trophies and awards
Ice hockey goaltender awards
Awards established in 1988